List of villages in Beni Suef Governorate

See also 

 Beni Suef

References

Villages in Egypt
Populated places in Beni Suef Governorate